Nora Eva Bretón Báez is a Mexican physicist whose research involves charged black holes. She is a researcher at CINVESTAV, the Center for Research and Advanced Studies of the National Polytechnic Institute.

Education and career
Bretón is originally from Puebla, where she did her high school and undergraduate studies. She earned a master's degree in physics from CINVESTAV in 1982, and completed her Ph.D. there in 1986.

Meanwhile, she took a part-time assistant professorship at UAM Azcapotzalco from 1983 to 1985. After completing her doctorate, she became a researcher at the Meritorious Autonomous University of Puebla from 1986 to 1989, before returning to CINVESTAV as a researcher in 1989. She also did postdoctoral research at the University of the Basque Country from 1990 to 1992.

Recognition
Bretón is a member of the Mexican Academy of Sciences, elected in 1990. She led the Division of Gravitation and Mathematical Physics of the Mexican Physical Society from 2001 to 2003.

References

External links

Year of birth missing (living people)
Living people
Mexican physicists
Mexican women physicists
Meritorious Autonomous University of Puebla alumni
Members of the Mexican Academy of Sciences